Jacob Tengström (4 December 1755 - 26 December 1832) was a Finnish prelate who became the first Archbishop of Turku and Finland.

Biography

Tengström was born on 4 December 1755 in Kokkola, Finland.

Tengström published the Finnish-Swedish children's books Läse-öfning för mina barn and Tidsfördrif för mina barn in 1795 and 1796, latter of which was translated into Finnish in 1836. He was editor of the Tidningar Utgifne Af et Sällskap i Åbo from 1791 to 1793 and was involved in the founding of the Finnish Bible Society and the Musical Society in Turku. In 1796, he became a member of the society Pro Fide et Christianismo, founded to promote Christian education.

During the Finnish war, when it became apparent that Sweden would not be able to defend Finland against the Russian Empire, he worked actively to make Finland adapt to the new situation and to promote Finland's interests in Russia. He opposed resistance. He participated actively in the preparations for the Diet of Porvoo which saw the establishment of the Evangelical Lutheran Church of Finland as a separate and independent church from the Church of Sweden. He also became chairman of a committee that drafted proposals for supreme governance for the Grand Duchy of Finland. Tengström's good relationship with Emperor Alexander I influenced the development of the Grand Duchy of Finland.

As a bishop and archbishop, Tengström also worked with extensive reforms of the service life. The ecclesiastical books were under revision in Sweden when the war broke out and the reforms in Finland were led by Tengström. Also a new church law was founded, where the church got a freer position.

He succeeded Jakob Gadolin upon his death in 1802 where he became bishop of Turku until 1817 when the title of "Bishop of Turku" ceased to exist and was elevated to archiepiscopal rank in 1817. The title of the see was changed to Archbishop of Turku and Finland, and Tengström became the first archbishop until his death in 1832.

See also
List of Bishops of Turku

References

Further reading

External links

Lutheran archbishops and bishops of Turku
19th-century Lutheran archbishops
19th-century Lutheran bishops
1755 births
1832 deaths
People from Kokkola